Horst Gustav Friedrich von Pflugk-Harttung (1889–1967) (alternate spelling Pflug-Hartnung) was a German intelligence officer and spy.

Weimar Germany
After serving in the army during the World War I, Pflugk-Harttung had become a member of the Freikorps, the paramilitary organizations that sprung up around Germany as soldiers returned in defeat from the war. The Freikorps were the key paramilitary groups active during the Weimar Republic. Many German veterans felt disconnected from civilian life and joined a Freikorps in search of stability within a military structure. Kapitänleutnant Horst von Pflugk-Harttung, along with his brother Heinz, were two such volunteers. The German volunteer movement was opposed to the communist Spartacists movement. During this period Pflugk-Harttung became friends with the future head of the Abwehr, Wilhelm Canaris. In 1919, Pflugk-Harttung along with his brother was accused of being directly involved in the murders of Spartacists Rosa Luxemburg and Karl Liebknecht. Both men were acquitted, but many evidently thought them guilty, and his brother was assassinated sometime later.{1920}

Sweden
In 1931, Pflugk-Harttung was recorded as helping to coordinate fascist groups and organisation in Sweden. The Swedish authorities had Pflugk-Harttung expelled after they discovered that he had been importing armaments illegally into Sweden for Munckska kåren. Pflugk-Harttung then went to Norway on a similar mission, but again, he was soon asked to leave.

Denmark
By 1933 Pflugk-Harttung was working for German Intelligence in Denmark. As a cover, he worked as correspondent for Berliner Boersen Zeitung, which was a newspaper of the Reich War Ministry. His duties included many covert tasks, one being keeping a close eye on the German exiles in Denmark, with the Danish police co-operating with him by using go-betweens. Along with other postgraduates of Gestapo spy schools, Pflugk-Harttung set up a spy ring that operated secret broadcasting stations and had engaged in nautical and hydrographical research. It had drawn up maps and charts, graphs and complicated mathematical tables of data, which required the best technicians even to understand. They communicated by complex code systems, which changed frequently. The outlay for such an extensive apparatus could be justified only as part of the Third Reich's preparation for war against major countries. Pflugk-Harttung's network watched and reported on British shipping movements into and out of the Baltic Sea. In 1938, information revealed by Ernst Wollweber to the Danish authorities, along with further investigations by the police led to the arrest of Pflugk-Harttung, along with eight other Germans and three Danes, who were charged with  operating as spies in Copenhagen. Investigations proved that the spy ring had been involved in the sabotage and sinking of Spanish trawlers on behalf of General Francisco Franco and his Nationalist Navy, which was operating from German ports. The acts included the use of the spying apparatus to shell and sink the SS Cantabria off the Norfolk coast by the Nationalist auxiliary cruiser Nadir.

For his part in the espionage, Pflugk-Harttung was sentenced to only a year-and-a-half in prison and was released after a few months because of pressure from the German government. After his release from prison, Pflugk-Harttung became one of the leading German intelligence chiefs in Denmark.

World War II 
He was arrested by US forces and taken to Arizona as a prisoner-of-war. Interrogators concluded that Pflugk-Harttung was "a patriotic German, but traditionally and violently opposed to all things Socialistic, Communistic and, above all, Asiatic. He is not a Nazi." He was held until November 1947 and then returned to Germany.

References

Singer, Kurt. Spies and Traitors of World War II. New York: Prentice-Hall, 1945. (Chapter 13)

1889 births
1967 deaths
20th-century Freikorps personnel
German Army personnel of World War I
World War II spies for Germany
German prisoners of war in World War II held by the United States